Oct-4 (octamer-binding transcription factor 4), also known as POU5F1 (POU domain, class 5, transcription factor 1), is a protein that in humans is encoded by the POU5F1 gene. Oct-4 is a homeodomain transcription factor of the POU family. It is critically involved in the self-renewal of undifferentiated embryonic stem cells. As such, it is frequently used as a marker for undifferentiated cells. Oct-4 expression must be closely regulated; too much or too little will cause differentiation of the cells.

	Octamer-binding transcription factor 4, OCT-4, is a transcription factor protein that is encoded by the POU5F1 gene and is part of the POU (Pit-Oct-Unc) family. OCT-4 consists of an octamer motif, a particular DNA sequence of AGTCAAAT that binds to their target genes and activates or deactivates certain expressions. These gene expressions then lead to phenotypic changes in stem cell differentiation during the development of a mammalian embryo. It plays a vital role in determining the fates of both inner mass cells and embryonic stem cells and has the ability to maintain pluripotency throughout embryonic development. Recently, it has been noted that OCT-4 not only maintains pluripotency in embryonic cells but also has the ability to regulate cancer cell proliferation and can be found in various cancers such as pancreatic, lung, liver and testicular germ cell tumors in adult germ cells. Another defect this gene can have is dysplastic growth in epithelial tissues which are caused by a lack of  OCT-4 within the epithelial cells.

Expression and function

Oct-4 transcription factor is initially active as a maternal factor in the oocyte and remains active in embryos throughout the preimplantation period. Oct-4 expression is associated with an undifferentiated phenotype and tumors.  Gene knockdown of Oct-4 promotes differentiation, demonstrating a role for these factors in human embryonic stem cell self-renewal. Oct-4 can form a heterodimer with Sox2, so that these two proteins bind DNA together.

Mouse embryos that are Oct-4 deficient or have low expression levels of Oct-4 fail to form the inner cell mass, lose pluripotency, and differentiate into trophectoderm. Therefore, the level of Oct-4 expression in mice is vital for regulating pluripotency and early cell differentiation since one of its main functions is to keep the embryo from differentiating.

Orthologs 
Orthologs of Oct-4 in humans and other species include:

Structure 
Oct-4 contains the following protein domains:

Implications in disease
Oct-4 has been implicated in tumorigenesis of adult germ cells.  Ectopic expression of the factor in adult mice has been found to cause the formation of dysplastic lesions of the skin and intestine.  The intestinal dysplasia resulted from an increase in progenitor cell population and the upregulation of β-catenin transcription through the inhibition of cellular differentiation.

Pluripotency in embryo development

Animal model 
In 2000, Niwa et al. used conditional expression and repression in murine embryonic stem cells to determine requirements for Oct-4 in the maintenance of developmental potency. Although transcriptional determination has often been considered as a binary on-off control system, they found that the precise level of Oct-4 governs 3 distinct fates of ES cells. An increase in expression of less than 2-fold causes differentiation into primitive endoderm and mesoderm. In contrast, repression of Oct-4 induces loss of pluripotency and dedifferentiation to trophectoderm. Thus, a critical amount of Oct-4 is required to sustain stem cell self-renewal, and up- or down-regulation induces divergent developmental programs. Changes to Oct-4 levels do not independently promote differentiation, but are also controlled by levels of Sox2. A decrease in Sox2 accompanies increased levels of Oct-4 to promote a mesendodermal fate, with Oct-4 actively inhibiting ectodermal differentiation. Repressed Oct-4 levels that lead to ectodermal differentiation are accompanied by an increase in Sox2, which effectively inhibits mesendodermal differentiation. Niwa et al. suggested that their findings established a role for Oct-4 as a master regulator of pluripotency that controls lineage commitment and illustrated the sophistication of critical transcriptional regulators and the consequent importance of quantitative analyzes.

The transcription factors Oct-4, Sox2 and Nanog are part of a complex regulatory network with Oct-4 and Sox2 capable of directly regulating Nanog by binding to its promoter, and are essential for maintaining the self-renewing undifferentiated state of the inner cell mass of the blastocyst, embryonic stem cell lines (which are cell lines derived from the inner cell mass), and induced pluripotent stem cells. While differential up- and down-regulation of Oct-4 and Sox2 has been shown to promote differentiation, down-regulation of Nanog must occur for differentiation to proceed.

Role in reprogramming

Oct-4 is one of the transcription factors used to create induced pluripotent stem cells (iPSCs), together with Sox2,  Klf4 and often c-Myc (OSKM) in mouse, demonstrating its capacity to induce an embryonic stem cell-like state. These factors are often referred to as "Yamanaka reprogramming factors". This reprogramming effect has also been seen with the Thomson reprogramming factors, reverting human fibroblast cells to iPSCs through Oct-4, along with Sox2, Nanog, and Lin28. The use of Thomson reprogramming factors avoids the need to overexpress c-Myc, an oncogene.  It was later determined that only two of these four factors, Oct4 and Klf4, were sufficient to reprogram mouse adult neural stem cells.  Finally it was shown that a single factor, Oct-4 was sufficient for this transformation. Moreover, while Sox2, Klf4, and cMyc could be replaced by their respective family members, Oct4's closer relatives, Oct1 and Oct6, fail to induce pluripotency, thus demonstrating the exclusiveness of Oct4 among POU transcription factors. However, later it was shown that Oct4 could be completely omitted from Yamanaka cocktail, and the remaining three factors, Sox2, Klf4, and cMyc (SKM) could generate mouse iPSCs with dramatically enhanced developmental potential. This suggests that Oct4 increases the efficiency of reprogramming, but decreases the quality of resulting iPSCs.

In embryonic stem cells
In in vitro experiments of mouse embryonic stem cells, Oct-4 has often been used as a marker of stemness, as differentiated cells show reduced expression of this marker.
Oct3/4 can both repress and activate the promoter of Rex1. In cells that already express high level of Oct3/4, exogenously transfected Oct3/4 will lead to the repression of Rex1. However, in cells that are not actively expressing Oct3/4, exogenous transfection of Oct3/4 will lead to the activation of Rex1. This implies a dual regulatory ability of Oct3/4 on Rex1. At low levels of the Oct3/4 protein, the Rex1 promoter is activated, while at high levels of the Oct3/4 protein, the Rex1 promoter is repressed.
Oct4 contributes to the rapid cell cycle of ESCs by promoting progression through the G1 phase, specifically through transcriptional inhibition of cyclin-dependent kinase inhibitors such as p21.
CRISPR-Cas9 knockout of the gene in human embryonic stem cells demonstrated that Oct-4 is essential for the development after fertilisation.
Oct3/4 represses Suv39h1 expression through the activation of an antisense long non-coding RNA. Suv39h1 inhibition maintains low level of H3K9me3 in pluripotent cells limiting the formation of heterochromatin.

In adult stem cells 

Several studies suggest a role for Oct-4 in sustaining self-renewal capacity of adult somatic stem cells (i.e. stem cells from epithelium, bone marrow, liver, etc.). Other scientists have produced evidence to the contrary, and dismiss those studies as artifacts of in vitro culture, or interpreting background noise as signal, and warn about Oct-4 pseudogenes giving false detection of Oct-4 expression.
Oct-4 has also been implicated as a marker of cancer stem cells.

See also 

Enhancer 
Histone 
Pribnow box 
RNA polymerase
Gene regulatory network

References

Further reading

External links 
 
 
 Generating iPS Cells from MEFS through Forced Expression of Sox-2, Oct-4, c-Myc, and Klf4

POU-domain proteins